C. exigua may refer to:

 Calamintha exigua, a flowering plant
 Campanula exigua, a bluebell endemic to California
 Canistropsis exigua, a plant endemic to Brazil
 Canna exigua, a garden plant
 Claytonia exigua, a western North American wildflower
 Cnaphalocrocis exigua, a grass moth
 Corticarina exigua, a minute brown scavenger beetle
 Curcuma exigua, a perennial herb
 Cymbella exigua, a unicellular algae
 Cymothoa exigua, a parasitic crustacean